Terrance Omar Ganaway (born October 7, 1988) is a former American football running back/fullback who played for a year in the National Football League (NFL) for the St. Louis Rams. He was drafted by the New York Jets in the sixth round of the 2012 NFL Draft. He played college football at Baylor University and previously the University of Houston.

College career
Ganaway played for the University of Houston as a freshman in 2007. Prior the 2008 season, he transferred to Baylor, where he played until 2011. As a senior, he was a starter and rushed for 1,547 yards with 21 touchdowns.

For his career, Ganaway had 2,592 rushing yards on 473 carries with 34 touchdowns.

Professional career

New York Jets
The New York Jets drafted Ganaway using their sixth round selection in the 2012 NFL Draft. Ganaway signed a four-year contract with the team on May 14, 2012. Ganaway was waived on August 31, 2012.

St. Louis Rams
Ganaway was claimed off waivers by the St. Louis Rams on September 1, 2012. Ganaway announced his retirement from the league on August 21, 2013 to pursue his graduate degree.

Personal life
Ganaway's uncle is former NFL linebacker Jeremiah Trotter.

References

External links
Baylor Bears bio 
New York Jets bio

1988 births
Living people
American football running backs
Houston Cougars football players
Baylor Bears football players
New York Jets players
St. Louis Rams players
People from DeKalb, Texas